The Hoppi-Copter was a functional backpack helicopter developed by the American company Hoppi-Copters Inc. founded by Horace T. Pentecost in the 1940s. The original Hoppi-Copter consisted of two contra-rotating rotors on a pole attached to a motorized backpack. Although it was capable of flight, it was extremely hard to control.

Later prototypes of the Hoppi-Copter included versions with the pilot in a sitting position, and were in effect miniature one-man helicopters of a more conventional design, though retaining the contra-rotating rotors and  thus obviating a tail rotor. Despite interest from the British Ministry of Supply in the 102 and 104 models, none were adopted commercially.

Variants
Pentecost HX-1 Hoppi-Copter (Hoppi-Copter 100) original back-pack version.
Hoppi-Copter 101 equipped with a seat and landing gear, proved that more development was necessary.
Hoppi-Copter 102 framed, with seat for pilot.
Hoppi-Copter 103 as the 102, but lighter with a more powerful engine and slightly greater rotor diameter
Hoppi-Copter 104 as the 103, with even greater rotor diameter
Hoppi-Copter Firefly

Specifications (Hoppi-Copter 102)

See also 
 Hiller YROE
 Gyrodyne RON Rotorcycle

References 

Helicopters
United States ultralight aircraft
Aircraft first flown in 1940
Coaxial rotor helicopters
Single-engined piston helicopters